is a Japanese ship-launched anti-submarine missile.

Description
Since FY1991, the  has started developing the range-extended version of ASROC to exploit the greater direct-path range of new low-frequency sonar (OQS-XX: later OQS-2x series). After that, following the end of the Cold War, it became a complete performance improvement version including not only simple range extension but also improvement in responsiveness.

The missile is fired from Mk 41 vertical launching system and the maximum speed reaches supersonic. It is controlled by inertial guidance system which uses a thrust vector control. The maximum range is said to be over 30 kilometers.

Operators 
 
- 
- 
-

See also 
 List of missiles by country#Japan
 RUM-139 VL-ASROC
 SMART

References

Books

Articles 
 

Guided missiles of Japan
Anti-submarine missiles